Aven Nelson (March 24, 1859 – March 31, 1952) was an American botanist who specialized in plants of the Rocky Mountains. He was one of the founding professors of the University of Wyoming, where he taught for 55 years as professor and served as president (1918-1922). He served as president of the American Society of Plant Taxonomists and Botanical Society of America.

Biography
Nelson was born at Sugar Creek, in Lee County, Iowa to parents Christen Nelson and Anne (Evenson) Nelson, who had immigrated from Norway. Aven was the youngest of four children in a Quaker family. He attended Kirksville State Normal School in Kirksville, Missouri from which he was graduated in 1883 with his Bachelor of Arts degree, while in 1887 he received the M. S. D. degree. He further continued his education in Drury College at Springfield, Missouri, which conferred upon him a Master of Science degree in 1890. He next entered Harvard University was awarded the Master of Arts degree in 1892.
In 1893, he co-founded the Rocky Mountain Herbarium.

He came to the University of Wyoming in 1887. In 1901, he was made fellow of the American Association for the Advancement of Science. In 1904, the University of Denver conferred upon him the degree of Doctor of Philosophy. In 1917, Nelson was named acting president, then president (1918) of the University of Wyoming, a position he held until 1922. In 1934, he was elected president of the Botanical Society of America. In 1927, he co-founded the 
Colorado-Wyoming Academy of Science. In 1935, he became president of the American Society of Plant Taxonomists.

Personal life
In 1885, he married Celia Alice Calhoun (1860-1929). They were the parents of two children. In 1931, he married fellow botanist Ruth Elizabeth Ashton (1896-1987) in Santa Fe, New Mexico. He died in Colorado Springs, Colorado in 1952. The Aven Nelson Memorial Building on the campus of the University of Wyoming is named in his honor.

Selected works
First report on the flora of Wyoming (1896) 
The Trees of Wyoming and How to Know Them (1899)
The Red Desert of Wyoming and its forage resources (1898) 
The Flora of Montana (1900)
The Cryptogams of Wyoming. A Preliminary Report upon those Species (1900) 
The Brome-Grasses of Wyoming (1901)
An Analytical Key to Some of the Common Flowering Plants of the Rocky Mountain Region (1902)
Shade tree suggestions (1903)
Spring Flora of the Intermountain States (1912)

Note

References

Other sources
Knobloch, Frieda E. (2005) Botanical Companions: a Memoir of Plants and Place (University of Iowa Press)

External links

American taxonomists
 
1859 births
1952 deaths
Presidents of the University of Wyoming
University of Wyoming faculty
Drury University alumni
Harvard University alumni
University of Denver alumni
American people of Norwegian descent
People from Lee County, Iowa
19th-century American botanists
20th-century American botanists
Truman State University alumni